O.O. Denny Park is a  park on the northeast shore of Lake Washington that is managed by the city of Kirkland, Washington but is owned by the city of Seattle.

History
Named for Seattle founder Arthur A. Denny's son Orion Orvil Denny (1853–1916), the site of present-day O.O. Denny Park served as Orion Denny's country estate. Orion Denny and his wife called their estate "Klahanie", which is Chinook for "out of doors." Following Orion's death in 1916, Denny's widow Helen willed Klahanie to the city of Seattle to become a public park named in memory of her husband.

The park opened to the public in 1922. In 1926, the park became a designated campsite for Seattle children. In 1954, the old Denny residence was torn down.

After 1968, Seattle turned management of the park over to King County. In 2002, management was taken over by the Finn Hill Park and Recreation District. The city of Kirkland begain managing the park in 2013, following its annexation of the Finn Hill neighborhood. The park remains owned by the city of Seattle.

Natural history
The park features an unusual quantity of trees over 150 feet tall, including grand firs, black cottonwoods, western hemlock, and cedars. Many Douglas firs stand over 200 feet tall, and are among the tallest trees in the Seattle area.

The park is one of four designated, protected bald eagle nesting areas in Kirkland, all on the Lake Washington shoreline.

Footnotes

References

Sources

External links

 (City of Kirkland Parks)
Trail map (Finn Hill Alliance, 2012)

 O. O. Denny Park — Washington Trails Association

1922 establishments in Washington (state)
Parks in Kirkland, Washington
Protected areas established in 1922